Dorrance House may refer to:

Arthur Dorrance House, Merchantville, New Jersey, listed on the National Register of Historic Places
W.H. Dorrance House, Camden, New York
Capt. George Dorrance House, Foster, Rhode Island
John M. Dorrance House, in Courtlandt Place, Houston, Texas

See also
Dorrance Inn
Dorrance Mansion